A bake sale, also known as a cake sale or cake stall, is a fundraising activity where baked goods such as doughnuts, cupcakes and cookies, sometimes along with other foods, are sold. Bake sales are usually held by small, non-profit organizations, such as clubs, school groups and charitable organizations. Bake sales are often set up around an area of pedestrian traffic, such as outside a grocery store or at a busy intersection near a mall. Bake sales are also a popular fund raising activities within corporations.

Items
Possible items that are popularly available at a bake sale may include the following:

 brownies
 cake slices
 cookies
 cupcakes
 doughnuts
 granola bars
 muffins
 pie slices
 Rice Krispies Treats

Themes

Two of the most popular types of bake sales are:
 Donation sale: community or club members contribute food they have made
 Volume sale: organization plans for food to be made, and provides members with recipes

Within these sales, different themes are often used:
 Season's Best
 Cupcake Theme
 Chocolate Theme
 Cookie Theme
 Cake Theme

References

External links
A Heritage of Bake Sales
Bake Sale Tips from the Worldwide Vegan Bake Sale
Bake Sale Flyers
Bake Sale Tips and Flyer Templates

Food retailing
Baked goods
Fundraising events